Randy Scott may refer to:

Randy Scott (American football) (born 1959), American football linebacker
Randy Scott (politician) (1946–2015), member of the South Carolina Senate
Randy Scott Santana (born 1983), Mexican association football player
Randy Scott (sportscaster), an American sportscaster who currently works for ESPN. He previously served as a sports anchor for WNUR sports radio.